Boschman is a Dutch and Mennonite surname. It may refer to:

 Dick Boschman-(born 1974), Dutch sports shooter who competed at 2000 Summer Olympic Games and 2004 Summer Olympic Games
 Eric Boschman (born 1964), Belgian sommelier
 Laurie Boschman (born 1960), Canadian Canadian retired professional ice hockey centre who played in the NHL for 14 seasons for the Toronto Maple Leafs, Edmonton Oilers, Winnipeg Jets, New Jersey Devils and Ottawa Senators, the team of which he was captain in his final NHL season

Dutch-language surnames